is a 2007 Japanese tokusatsu superhero film directed by Ryuta Tasaki and written by Toshiki Inoue. The film was released on October 27, 2007. The film borrows elements from the Kamen Rider V3 television series and is a sequel to the Kamen Rider: The First movie (which was a film adaptation of the original Kamen Rider series). 

Actor Kazuki Kato, who had previously portrayed Daisuke Kazama/Kamen Rider Drake in Kamen Rider Kabuto, portrayed Shiro Kazami/Kamen Rider V3. Both Masaya Kikawada and Hassei Takano reprise their roles as Takeshi Hongo/Kamen Rider 1 and Hayato Ichimonji/Kamen Rider 2, respectively. It was given a PG-12 rating for its brief nudity and violence.

Plot
Two years after the events of Kamen Rider the First, a strange series of bizarre and gruesome murders occur, all connected to pop star Chiharu's song "Platinum Smile". Meanwhile, Takeshi Hongo has become a high school science teacher. One student, in particular, catches his eye, a troubled girl named Kotomi Kikuma, who was best friends with Chiharu. When she and Hongo find a dying "Chiharu", they discover she is an imposter before the Shocker Inhumanoid Chainsaw Lizard arrives with six Shocker Riders to eliminate Hongo, forcing him to reveal himself as Kamen Rider 1 to Kotomi before escaping his hunters. Meanwhile, Hayato Ichimonji is slowly weakening due to his body rejecting the cybernetic enhancements that turned him into Kamen Rider 2.

The next day, Hongo saves Kotomi from a group of punks with his superhuman abilities, scaring nearby students. She asks for his help in finding Chiharu, which he accepts. They begin their investigation by locating Chiharu's older brother Shiro Kazami, the former president of the rising IT enterprise ExaStream, whose staff disappeared two months prior. Making their way to Kazami's holiday home, Hongo and Kotomi discover he is in league with Shocker. As Hongo fights Chainsaw Lizard and the Shocker Riders, Kazami joins the fray as the Shocker Inhumanoid "V3". Following a high-speed chase, V3 and the Shocker Riders defeat Hongo, but Ichimonji arrives to help Hongo escape. After discovering one of his sister's imposters, Kazami finds Hongo and Ichimonji again and reveals he was the sole survivor of a Shocker experiment involving nanobots designed to convert all humans in Japan into cyborgs that claimed his staff. The three Riders later learn Kotomi found another Chiharu imposter, who reveals the real one was disfigured by her rivals and committed suicide. Refusing to accept this, Chiharu's record label forced the girls responsible to become her stand-ins so they could release "Platinum Smile". The latest imposter runs off, but she, Chiharu's manager, and the record dealer are later killed by Chiharu's ghost.

After Kazami reveals to Hongo that Shocker's foreign branch brought a shipment of nanobots to spread across the nation, Hongo and Ichimonji intercept the convoy and battle the operation's mastermind, Scissors Jaguar. They are initially overwhelmed until Kazami joins them. Hongo and Ichimonji kill Scissors Jaguar while V3 destroys Chainsaw Lizard and the nanobots before encountering Chiharu, who had been exposed to, revived, and mutated by the nanobots into a monster. She pleads for him to end her suffering, which he reluctantly agrees to. With Chiharu's death, the "Platinum Smile" incidents seemingly end, Ichimonji leaves to spend his final moments at his favorite Ginza bar, Kazami decides to start a new life, and Hongo quits his job due to complaints about his saving Kotomi.

A post-credits scene set in a pachinko bar reveals that the "Platinum Smile" curse may not have truly ended with Chiharu claiming another victim.

Characters

Heroes
 Kamen Rider 1
 Kamen Rider 2
 Kamen Rider V3 (Originally he is one of Shocker cyborgs, codenamed , who later defects to fight alongside Riders 1 & 2)

Villains
 The Great Leader of Shocker (cameo voice only like his television series counterpart. He is alive after the movie's ending)
 : A warped scissor-bladed jaguar cyborg who can morph his hands into blades, the mastermind behind Shocker's nano-tech project who caused Kazami's transformation into V3. Based at the restaurant Legend of Gathering, Scissors Jaguar intended to turn all of Japan into cyborgs with the nanobots. However, his plans were foiled as he was killed by the Double Riders' Rider Double Kick and Rider Double Punch combo.
 : Formerly Kazami's secretary, she was exposed to the nanobots and became a sensual lizard cyborg who can change her right arm into a regenerable buzzsaw weapon that can cut through anything. She serves as Scissor Jaguar's 2nd in command before being eventually killed by Kamen Rider V3's V3 Return Kick when she attempts to escape with the nanobots.
 : Riders based on Kamen Riders 1 and 2. They are mass-produced as soldiers of Shocker, and are enhanced in terms of abilities and powers under nano-technology.

Chiharu
Kazami's younger sister, Chiharu was a Japanese idol who was exposed to the nanobots the day her brother became V3. Because she left before Shocker quarantined the ExaStream building, Chiharu was unaware of her being infected until it was too late as her rivals pushed her down some stairs into a live electric circuit, severely disfiguring her face. Unable to cope with it, Chiharu attempted suicide after leaving a note to have her wristwatch sent to her brother. However, Tristar Promotions refused to make her death public, and used the very girls responsible for Chiharu's disfigurement to stand in for her as they release her final song, "Platinum Smile". In order to cover up Chiharu's death, the executives at Tristar Promotions disposed of her body in the city sewers, where the nanobots in Chiharu's body malfunctioned as they revived her into a sub-human monstrosity.

The song "Platinum Smile" soon after became a thing of urban legend, as Chiharu's "ghost" brutally murders those who listen to it, as well as those were covering up her demise. In the end, Kazami faces the wretched beast that was once his sister, and in an emotional climax, kills her. Chiharu seemed to finally be at rest, but it seems that the curse of "Platinum Smile" did not die with Chiharu, as her "ghost" appears again, hate-filled and embarking on a bizarre murder spree.

Cast
 Masaya Kikawada as Takeshi Hongo
 Hassei Takano as Hayato Ichimonji
 Kazuki Kato as Shiro Kazami
 Miku Ishida as Kotomi Kikuma
 Erika Mori as Chiharu Kazami
 Gorō Naya as The Great Leader of Shocker (voice)
 Tomorowo Taguchi as Scissors Jaguar
 Rie Mashiko as Chainsaw Lizard
 Shinji Rokkaku as Yamazaki
 Takako Miki
 Kyusaku Shimada as Shindou
  as Vice-Principal
 Katsumi Shiono as Shocker Combatmen/Shocker Riders (voice)

Songs
Theme song
"Chosen Soldier"
Lyrics & Artist: ISSA
Composition: 
Insert song
"Platinum Smile"
Lyrics & Artist: Riyu Kosaka
Composition: LOVE+HATE

References

External links
MaskedRiderNext.jp: Official website 
 

2007 films
Films directed by Ryuta Tasaki
The Next